The list of people executed by the U.S. state of Texas, with the exception of 1819–1849, is divided into periods of 10 years.
	

Between 1819 and 1923, 390 people were executed by hanging in the county where the trial took place. During the American Civil War, three Confederate deserters and a man convicted of attempted rape were executed by firing squad. The law was changed in 1923 requiring executions to be carried out in the electric chair at the Huntsville Unit in Huntsville, Texas. From 1924 to 1964, 361 people were executed in this way. After an 18-year gap following Furman v. Georgia, executions were resumed following new capital-punishment laws passed by the State of Texas (and upheld in Gregg v. Georgia, which also included a companion case from Texas), among them changing the method of execution to lethal injection.

The number is over four times as many as Oklahoma (the state with the second-highest total of executions in the post-Gregg era and the only one with a higher execution rate) and over 37 times as many as California (the state with the largest number of death row inmates; California has not executed anyone since January 2006, and has a moratorium on capital punishment ).

Executions from 1819

 1819–1849: 9 executions
 1850–1859: 18 executions
 1860–1869: 20 executions
 1870–1879: 50 executions
 1880–1889: 64 executions
 1890–1899: 101 executions
 1900–1909: 71 executions
 1910–1919: 51 executions
 1920–1929: 66 executions
 1930–1939: 122 executions
 1940–1949: 78 executions
 1950–1959: 76 executions
 1960–1964: 29 executions
 1982–1989: 33 executions
 1990–1999: 166 executions
 2000–2009: 248 executions
 2010–2019: 120 executions
 2020–present: 16 executions

See also

 Capital punishment in Texas
 Capital punishment in the United States
 Lists of people executed in the United States

References

Further reading
Harnsberger, R. Scott. A Guide to Sources of Texas Criminal Justice Statistics [North Texas Crime and Criminal Justice Series, no.6]. Denton: University of North Texas Press, 2011.

External links
Texas Scheduled Executions
Texas Offenders on Death Row

 
 
Executed